Asaiah (Hebrew: עשיה "God made me") was the personal secretary of Josiah, king of Judah in the 7th century BCE, and according to the Bible (II Kings, Chapter 22, and Books of Chronicles 2, Chapter 34), is one of Josiah's deputation to the prophet Huldah. A seal with the text Asayahu servant of the king probably belonged to him.

Other biblical figures
 Asaiah (Simeonite) a prince of the tribe of Simeon who attacked and captured Gedor, and settled there (I Chron. iv. 36)
 Asaiah (Levite) a Levite appointed to take part in bringing back the Ark of the Covenant (I Chron. vi. 15 [A. V. 30]; xv. 6, 11)
 Asaiah (Shilonite) a Shilonite residing in Jerusalem (I Chron. ix. 5) identical with Maaseiah (Neh. xi. 5)

See also
 Asaiah Ziv

References

Sources
  (3 Volumes)

7th-century BCE Jews
Tribe of Simeon
Levites